Massimiliano (Max) Garagnani is a University Professor at the University of London, and is primarily known for his work on bio-plausible neural network models that closely mimic the structure, connectivity, and physiology of the human cortex. Garagnani presently runs the Goldsmith Computational Cognitive Neuroscience Postgraduate Programme  at the University of London, and further serves as a visiting researcher at the Free University of Berlin.

His contributions to the field of computational neuroscience have earned him a number of awards and honors, including the  CSREA International Conference on AI Achievement Award, an EU Marie Curie Fellowship, a Cambridge European Trust Scholarship, and membership into the Experimental Psychology Society, the Cognitive Neuroscience Society, and the Society for the Neurobiology of Language.

Biography
Garagnani obtained his Bachelor of Science and his Master of Science degrees in 1994 through an accelerated program at the University of Bologna in Italy. He then went on to obtain his doctorate in Artificial Intelligence from the University of Durham in 1999, followed by a postdoctoral stint at The Open University.

During his time there, he sat as editor of the journal of Expert Systems, and served as a visiting scholar at the University of California, Berkeley and the International Computer Science Institute in Berkeley, California, US, developing a neurally plausible connectionist model of language processing and reflexive reasoning based on temporal synchrony and dynamic binding alongside Dr. Lokendra Shastri. He left this post in 2005, opting for a second PhD, this one in computational cognitive neuroscience, at Cambridge University.

Upon its completion in 2009, Garagnani joined the university's Medical Research Council Unit as an investigating scientist. He departed from the MRC in 2012, becoming a visiting researcher at Cambridge University's Department of Experimental Psychology. He balanced this position with a postdoctoral fellowship at the University of Plymouth, which he held until 2016.

As of 2016, Garagnani is a professor and programme leader at the University of London, as well as a visiting researcher at the Brain & Language Laboratory at the Free University of Berlin.

Awards and honors
 EPS Grindley Grant
 EU Marie Curie Fellow
 Gonda Brain Research Grant
 CSREA AI Achievement Award
 Cognitive Neuroscience Society
 Experimental Psychology Society
 Society for the Neurobiology of Language
 Cambridge European Trust Scholar (Honorary)

Select publications

References

External links

 Goldsmiths Profile page

Living people
Italian neuroscientists
Academics of the University of London
Academics of the University of Cambridge
Year of birth missing (living people)
Place of birth missing (living people)
University of Bologna alumni
21st-century Italian scientists
Alumni of Durham University Graduate Society